Shoal Creek Baptist Church is a historic church in Edwardsville, Alabama.  It was built in 1895 and added to the National Register of Historic Places on December 4, 1974. The present church building is apparently the third to have been built at the site.

There is no record of the formal end of the church fellowship. The church declined due to membership relocation and by 1914 apparently so many had left, that the church no longer met regularly.  The last entry in the existing minutes is dated September 6, 1914. Since the cessation of the church fellowship, the building has been used occasionally for family gatherings, weddings, or for church services of a local congregation.  Its most regular use has been for an annual Sacred Harp singing.

Gallery

References

External links

Official Site

Baptist churches in Alabama
Former churches in Alabama
Churches on the National Register of Historic Places in Alabama
Churches completed in 1887
19th-century churches in the United States
Buildings and structures in Cleburne County, Alabama
National Register of Historic Places in Cleburne County, Alabama